Ryan Delbert Snare (born February 8, 1979) is an American former professional baseball pitcher. He played in Major League Baseball (MLB) for the Texas Rangers.

Career
He pitched 3 innings of relief and gave up 4 earned runs.

In , pitching for the University of North Carolina, Snare went 10-1 with a 3.14 ERA and was drafted by the Cincinnati Reds in the 2nd round of the 2000 Major League Baseball Draft. On July 11, he was traded to the Florida Marlins along with Juan Encarnación and Wilton Guerrero for Ryan Dempster. Exactly one year later, he was traded to the Texas Rangers as part of a package for veteran closer Ugueth Urbina. In 2004 with the Triple-A Oklahoma RedHawks, Snare went 11-6 with a 4.72 ERA and made his major league debut with the Rangers. On July 20, he was released by the Rangers and signed with the San Diego Padres on July 26. A free agent at the end of the year, he signed with the Kansas City Royals for the  season. He made 7 starts for Double-A Wichita before being released on May 13.

External links

1979 births
Living people
People from Clearwater, Florida
Baseball players from Florida
Major League Baseball pitchers
Texas Rangers players
North Carolina Tar Heels baseball players
Dayton Dragons players
Stockton Ports players
Chattanooga Lookouts players
Portland Sea Dogs players
Carolina Mudcats players
Oklahoma RedHawks players
Frisco RoughRiders players
Mobile BayBears players
Portland Beavers players
Wichita Wranglers players
Grand Canyon Rafters players